Aleksandr Antonov may refer to:

 Aleksandr Antonov (politician) (1888–1922), Russian politician
 Aleksandr Antonov (actor) (1898–1962), Russian actor
 Aleksandr Antonov (footballer) (born 1958), Russian football player and coach